Delphine Records or Delphine Productions is a French record label, founded in 1974 by French composer Paul de Senneville and his partner Olivier Toussaint.

History
In 1974, Paul de Senneville set up his own record company, Delphine (named after Paul's first daughter, Delphine), with Olivier Toussaint.

Delphine in one of the leading French music exporters to the world market.  It is also the only company specialising in instrumental music.  Nowadays, the Delphine group represents 15 companies dealing with various activities: an advertising film and clip production company, an agency for advertising and casting actors and a casting agency, as well as two modelling agencies.

This Delphine is not to be confused with a small independent American record label started approximately 30 years later called Delphine Records.

Delphine Records artists

 Richard Clayderman
 Nicolas de Angelis
 Jean-Claude Borelly
 Anarchic System
 Ocarina

See also
 List of record labels
 Delphine Software International

References

External links
 http://www.clayderman.co.uk/

French record labels
Pop record labels
Record labels established in 1974
1974 establishments in France